Nuno Albertino Varela Tavares (born 26 January 2000) is a Portuguese professional footballer who plays as a left-back for Ligue 1 club Marseille, on loan from Premier League club Arsenal.

Club career

Benfica
Born in Lisbon of Cape Verdean descent, Tavares finished his development with Benfica after three years at city rivals Sporting CP and two stints with Casa Pia. His manager at Casa Pia, João Silva, drove him home from training every day while also allowing his studies to take priority.

Tavares made his senior debut with Benfica's reserves in the LigaPro, his first match being a 3–2 home win against Covilhã on 27 October 2018. He played his first official game with the first team on 4 August 2019, featuring 90 minutes in the 5–0 victory over Sporting in the Supertaça Cândido de Oliveira at the Estádio Algarve. His Primeira Liga bow took place the following week, opening an eventual 5–0 home defeat of Paços de Ferreira and adding two assists. However, his weaknesses were exposed two weeks later in a 2–0 loss to Porto in O Clássico, which led him to return to the B side and lose his place to Tomás Tavares, being limited to occasional domestic cup matches in place of Alejandro Grimaldo.

Following a difficult season, and a video posted on the Instagram account of a friend of Tavares where Grimaldo was referred to in derogatory terms, Benfica decided to sell the player in spite of his public apologies. During his spell at the club, he made 41 competitive appearances.

Arsenal
On 10 July 2021, Tavares joined Arsenal on a long-term contract in a deal worth around £8 million. He made his Premier League debut on 13 August, coming on as a late substitute for Calum Chambers in a 2–0 away defeat to Brentford. Following an injury to Kieran Tierney he managed to earn a starting spot, initially achieving good performances and earning praise from coach Mikel Arteta, who especially liked his attacking qualities; however, he also struggled with homesickness, and his defensive frailties, positional mistakes and lapses in concentration led to him being regularly substituted at half-time during matches, most notably when he offered a goal to Diogo Jota in the 4–0 defeat to Liverpool following a misplaced pass.

Tavares scored his first goal on 23 April 2022, through a calm tap-in after David de Gea had saved Bukayo Saka's curl in the third minute of an eventual 3–1 home win against Manchester United.

Loan to Marseille
On 30 July 2022, Tavares moved to Ligue 1 club Marseille on a season-long loan; he wanted to have the option to sign permanently at the end of the deal, but Arteta refused to sanction it. He scored on his debut, a 4–1 home victory over Reims. He repeated the feat the following matchday, in the 1–1 draw at Brest.

Tavares improved his form under manager Igor Tudor, with his attacking style being put to good use in the latter's system. On 2 January 2023, however, in the last minutes of a 2–1 away defeat of Montpellier – he had opened the score at the start of the second half – he gave away a penalty after deliberately kicking Arnaud Souquet in the box and was consequently sent off, being handed a three-match ban for his actions two days later.

International career
Tavares won his first cap for Portugal at under-21 level on 10 September 2019, in a 2–0 win in Belarus for the 2021 UEFA European Championship qualifiers. On 7 October 2021, against Liechtenstein in the next edition, he scored the first goal in the 11–0 rout in Vizela.

Tavares was included in a provisional squad for the 2022 FIFA World Cup in Qatar, but did not make the final cut.

Media
Tavares was involved in the Amazon Original sports docuseries All or Nothing: Arsenal, which documented the club by spending time with the coaching staff and players behind the scenes both on and off the field throughout their 2021–22 season.

Career statistics

Honours
Benfica
Supertaça Cândido de Oliveira: 2019

References

External links
Arsenal official profile
Premier League official profile

2000 births
Living people
Portuguese sportspeople of Cape Verdean descent
Black Portuguese sportspeople
Portuguese footballers
Footballers from Lisbon
Association football defenders
Primeira Liga players
Liga Portugal 2 players
Casa Pia A.C. players
Sporting CP footballers
S.L. Benfica B players
S.L. Benfica footballers
Premier League players
Arsenal F.C. players
Ligue 1 players
Olympique de Marseille players
Portugal youth international footballers
Portugal under-21 international footballers
Portuguese expatriate footballers
Expatriate footballers in England
Expatriate footballers in France
Portuguese expatriate sportspeople in England
Portuguese expatriate sportspeople in France